The Air Command Commander Sport is an American autogyro that was designed and produced by Air Command International of Wylie, Texas. Now out of production, when it was available the aircraft was supplied as a kit for amateur construction.

Design and development
The Commander Sport was designed to comply with the US Experimental - Amateur-built aircraft rules. It features a single main rotor, a single-seat open cockpit with a small cockpit fairing with a windshield, tricycle landing gear with a steerable nose wheel and wheel pants, plus a tail caster. The standard engine supplied was the twin cylinder, liquid-cooled, two-stroke, dual-ignition  Rotax 582 engine in pusher configuration. The  Rotax 503 and  Rotax 447 engines were factory options.

The aircraft fuselage is made from metal tubing, while the fairing is fiberglass.

Original factory kit options were a pre-rotator, cockpit fairing, wheels pants and long range fuel tank. The manufacturer estimated the construction time from the supplied kit as 30 hours and put completion time as 3–4 days work.

Specifications (Commander Sport)

References

External links
Photo of an Air Command Commander Sport

Commander Sport
1990s United States sport aircraft
1990s United States ultralight aircraft
Homebuilt aircraft
Single-engined pusher autogyros